G-8 was a heroic aviator and spy during World War I in pulp fiction. He starred in his own title G-8 and His Battle Aces, published by Popular Publications. All stories were written by Robert J. Hogan, under his own name.  The title lasted 110 issues, from October 1933 to June 1944. Many of the novels have been reprinted by a wide range of publishers including comic books.

While not as dramatic a pulp character as Doc Savage or the Shadow, his stories were often outlandish, with many supernatural or science fiction elements. G-8's true identity was never revealed. He had a girlfriend, a nurse who aided his group, and her name as well was never revealed. His English manservant was named Battle. His wing-men were the short Nippy Weston, who flew an aircraft numbered 13, and the tall and muscular but superstitious Bull Martin, whose aircraft was numbered 7. Both of them were Americans. His adventures entailed fighting against the lethal super technology that was constantly created by the Kaiser's mad scientists.  Reoccurring villains included Herr Doktor Krueger, the Steel Mask, and Grun.

A character based on G-8 made two appearances in the comic book Planetary alongside many other pulp analogues as part of a society for the betterment of humankind.

List of G-8 and His Battle Aces titles

 The Bat Staffel
 Purple Aces
 Ace of the White Death
 The Midnight Eagle
 The Vampire Staffel
 The Skeleton Patrol
 Squadron of Corpses
 The Invisible Staffel
 The Dynamite Squadron
 The Dragon Patrol
 The Hurricane Patrol
 The Panther Squadron
 The Spider Staffel
 The Mad Dog Squadron
 The Blizzard Staffel
 The X-Ray Eye
 Squadron of the Scorpion
 The Death Monsters
 The Cave Man Patrol
 The Gorilla Staffel
 The Sword Staffel
 Wings of the Juggernaut
 The Headless Staffel
 Staffel of Beasts
 Claws of the Sky Monster
 Staffel of Invisible Men
 Staffel of the Floating Heads
 The Blood Bat Staffel
 Skeletons of the Black Cross
 The Patrol of the Dead
 Scourge of the Sky Beast
 The Wings of Satan
 Patrol of the Cloud Crusher
 Curse of the Sky Wolves
 Vultures of the Purple Death
 Wings of Invisible Doom
 Skies of Yellow Death
 Death Rides the Ceiling
 Patrol of the Mad
 Scourge of the Steel Mask
 Patrol of the Murder Masters
 Fangs of the Sky Leopard
 Vultures of the White Death
 Flight of the Dragon
 Flight from the Grave
 Patrol of the Purple Clan
 Vengeance of the Vikings
 Flight of the Green Assassin
 The Hand of Steel
 The Flight of the Hell Hawks
 The Drome of the Damned
 Satan Paints the Sky
 Wings for the Dead
 Patrol of the Phantom
 The Black Aces of Doom
 The Flames of Hell
 Patrol of the Iron Hand
 Fangs of the Serpent
 Aces of the Damned
 Patrol of the Sky Vulture
 The Condor Rides with Death
 Flying Coffins of the Damned
 The Bloody Wings of the Vampire
 Raiders of the Silent Death
 The Sky Serpent Flies Again
 The Black Wings of the Raven
 Death Rides the Last Patrol
 Three Fly with Satan
 Flight of the Death Battalion
 Wings of the Black Terror
 Patrol of the Iron Scourge
 Wings of the White Death
 The Black Buzzard Flies to Hell
 Red Fangs of the Sky Emperor
 The Falcon Flies with the Damned
 Sky-Guns for the Murder Master
 White Wings for the Dead
 Sky Coffins for Satan
 Wings of the Dragon Lord
 The Green Scourge of the Sky Raiders
 Red Wings for the Death Patrol
 The Damned Will Fly Again
 Death Rides the Midnight Patrol
 Bloody Wings for a Sky Hawk
 Red Skies for the Squadron of Satan
 Here Flies the Hawk of Hell
 Squadron of the Damned
 Death To the Hawks of War
 Hordes of the Wingless Death
 Raiders of the Red Death
 Wings of the Doomed
 Fangs of the Winged Cobra
 Death is My Destiny
 Squadron of the Flying Dead
 Horde of the Black Eagle
 The Death Divers
 Raiders of the Death Patrol
 The Mark of the Vulture
 The Death Master's Last Patrol
 Wings of the Gray Phantom
 The Squadron of Death Flies High
 The Patrol to the End of the World
 Wings of the Hawks of Death
 Scourge of the Sky Monster
 Winged Beasts of Death
 Bombs from the Murder Wolves
 Wings of the Iron Claw
 The Devil's Sky Trap
 Wings of the Death Monster
 Wings of the Death Tiger

Reprints

During the craze for hero pulp reprints in the 1970s started by the success of Doc Savage reprints, Berkley Books reprinted 8 G-8 novels.  The first 3 had covers by Jim Steranko and a logo inspired by Doc Savage's.  After that, the covers reprinted the original pulp covers.

In more recent years, some G-8 novels were reprinted by small presses like Adventure House.  Adventure House recently started a reprint series of G-8 in similar size to the original pulps, including covers and interior artwork.  So far, they have reprinted over 40 issues.

References

External links
G-8's page at International Superheroes Catalog
Planetary volume one issue one
Planetary volume one issue five

Fictional secret agents and spies
Gold Key Comics titles
Fictional World War I veterans
Fictional aviators
Aviation novels